Vinifera is a locality in Victoria, Australia, located approximately 22 km from Swan Hill, Victoria. It was named after Vitis vinifera the Common Grape Vine, when grapes were planted here on irrigated land.

The Post Office opened on 1 February 1907 as Tyntynder West and was renamed Vinifera in 1922.

References

Towns in Victoria (Australia)
Rural City of Swan Hill
Populated places on the Murray River